University of Galway GAA comprises the Gaelic football and hurling teams at the University of Galway.

Competitions in which they feature include the Sigerson Cup, Fitzgibbon Cup, and Walsh Cup.

Historically, they have won the Galway Senior Football Championship and contested the FBD Insurance League.

They are the second most prolific winners of the Sigerson Cup.

Honours

Notable players

Football
 Gareth Bradshaw
 Ger Cafferkey
 Matthew Clancy (Sigerson Cup winner 2003)
 Brendan Colleran (Sigerson Cup winner 2003)
 Enda Colleran (Sigerson Cup winning captain 1964)
 Damien Comer
 Seán Óg De Paor (Sigerson Cup winning captain 1992)
 Alan Dillon
 Jason Doherty
 Dessie Dolan
 Gary Fahey (Sigerson Cup winner 1992)
 Robert Finnerty
 Peadár Gardiner
 Mark Gottsche
 Seán Kelly (Sigerson Cup finalist 2018, winner 2022)
 Richie Lee (Sigerson Cup winning captain 1984)
 Mick Loftus (Sigerson Cup winner)
 Joe McDonagh
 Colm McFadden (Sigerson Cup winner 2003)
 Con McGrath (Sigerson Cup winner 1949)
 Gay McManus (Sigerson Cup winner 1980, winning captain 1981)
 John Maughan (won two Sigerson Cups while playing for UCG in the early 1980s)
 Michael Meehan (Sigerson Cup winner 2003)
 Kieran Molloy (played for NUIG and Corofin on the same day in February 2018)
 Ciarán Murtagh
 David O'Gara
 Matthew Tierney (Sigerson Cup winning captain 2022)
 Tomás Tierney (Sigerson Cup winner 1981 & 1983, winning captain 1984)

Hurling
 Enda Barrett
 Daithí Burke
 Niall Burke
 Conor Cleary
 John Conlon (scorer of the winning point in the 82nd minute of the final of the 2010 Fitzgibbon Cup)
 Joe Connolly (Fitzgibbon Cup winner 1977)
 Joseph Cooney
 Danny Cullen
 Barry Daly
 Cian Dillon
 Darragh Egan
 Cyril Farrell (Fitzgibbon Cup winner 1977)
 Pat Fleury (Fitzgibbon Cup winner 1977)
 Francis Forde
 Paul Gordon
 Tony Griffin
 John Hanbury
 Aidan Harte
 Conor Hayes (Fitzgibbon Cup winner 1977)
 Séamus Hennessy (Fitzgibbon Cup winner 2010)
 David Kenny
 John Lee (Fitzgibbon Cup winner 2010)
 Seán Loftus
 Jeffrey Lynskey
 Joe McDonagh (Fitzgibbon Cup winner 1977)
 Cathal Mannion
 Pádraic Mannion
 Stephen Molumphy
 Jamesie O'Connor
 Domhnall O'Donovan (Fitzgibbon Cup winner 2010)
 Colin Ryan
 Donal Tuohy (Fitzgibbon Cup winner 2010)
 Conor Whelan

Management
Managers have included:

Football
 Gerry Fahy (2003 Sigerson Cup-winning manager, later appointed Offaly senior football team manager
 John Maughan (2011, 2012)
 Eoin O'Donnellan ( 2009)
 Maurice Sheridan ( 2018}

Hurling

References

 
Gaelic football clubs in County Galway
Hurling clubs in County Galway
GAA
Galway